Prevention through design (PtD), also called safety by design usually in Europe, is the concept of applying methods to minimize occupational hazards early in the design process, with an emphasis on optimizing employee health and safety throughout the life cycle of materials and processes.  It is a concept and movement that encourages construction or product designers to "design out" health and safety risks during design development. The concept supports the view that along with quality, programme and cost; safety is determined during the design stage. It increases the cost-effectiveness of enhancements to occupational safety and health.

This method for reducing workplace safety risks lessens workers' reliance on personal protective equipment, which is the least effective of the hierarchy of hazard control.

Background 
Each year in the U.S., 55,000 people die from work-related injuries and diseases, 294,000 are made sick, and 3.8 million are injured. The annual direct and indirect costs have been estimated to range from $128 billion to $155 billion. Recent studies in Australia indicate that design is a significant contributor to 37% of work-related fatalities; therefore, the successful implementation of prevention through design concepts can have substantial impacts on worker health and safety.

A safer workplace can be created by removing hazards and reducing worker risks to an appropriate level "at the source," or as early in the life cycle of products or workplaces as possible.
Designing, redesigning and retrofitting new and current work environments, systems, tools, facilities, equipment, machinery, goods, chemicals, work processes, and work organization. Improving the working climate by incorporating preventive approaches into all designs that have an effect on employees and those on the premises.
The strategic plan lays out the objectives for implementing the PtD Plan for the National Initiative successfully.

The National Institute for Occupational Safety and Health (NIOSH) in the United States is a major contributor and promoter of PtD policy and guidelines. NIOSH considers PtD to be "the most effective and reliable type" of prevention of occupational injuries. A core tenet of PtD philosophy the concept of addressing workplace hazards using methods at the top of the Hierarchy of Controls, namely elimination and substitution.

Within Europe, construction designers are legally bound to design out risks during design development to reduce hazards in the construction and end use phases via the Mobile Worksite Directive (also known as CDM regulations in the UK). The concept supports this legal requirement.  Some Notified Bodies provide testing and design verification services to ensure compliance with the safety standards defined in regulation codes such as the American Society of Mechanical Engineers.  Many non-governmental organizations have been established to support this aim, principally in the UK, Australia and the United States.

History
While engineering, as a rule, factors human safety into the design process, a modern appraisal of specific links to design and workers' safety can be seen in efforts beginning in the 1800s.  Trends included the widespread implementation of guards for machinery, controls for elevators, and boiler safety practices. This was followed by enhanced design for ventilation, enclosures, system monitors, lockout/tagout controls, and hearing protectors. More recently, there has been the development of chemical process safety, ergonomically engineered tools, chairs, and work stations, lifting devices, retractable needles, latex-free gloves, and a parade of other safety devices and processes.

In 2007, the US National Institute for Occupational Health and Safety began its National Initiative on Prevention through Design with the goal of promoting prevention through design philosophy, practice, and policy.

Goal 
The PtD National Initiative's goal is to avoid or mitigate occupational accidents, diseases, deaths, and exposures by incorporating prevention factors into all designs that impact people in the workplace. This is accomplished by eliminating hazards and reducing worker risks to an acceptable level "at the source," or as early in the life cycle of items or workplaces as possible.
Designing, redesigning, and retrofitting new and existing work premises, structures, tools, facilities, equipment, machinery, products, substances, work processes, and work organization.

Integration
Prevention through design represents a shift in approach for on-the-job safety. It involves evaluating potential risks associated with processes, structures, equipment, and tools. It takes into consideration the construction, maintenance, decommissioning, and disposal or recycling of waste material.
 
The idea of redesigning job tasks and work environments has begun to gain momentum in business and government as a cost-effective means to enhance occupational safety and health. Many U.S. companies openly support PtD concepts and have developed management practices to implement them. Other countries are actively promoting PtD concepts as well. The United Kingdom began requiring construction companies, project owners, and architects to address safety and health during the design phase of projects in 1994. Australia developed the Australian National OHS Strategy 2002–2012, which set "eliminating hazards at the design stage" as one of five national priorities. As a result, the Australian Safety and Compensation Council (ASCC) developed the Safe Design National Strategy and Action Plans for Australia encompassing a wide range of design areas.

In the US

Government 
The National Institute for Occupational Safety and Health (NIOSH) is a large contributor to prevention through design efforts in the United States. Several NIOSH initiatives and guidelines directly or indirectly advocate for PtD practices. Through NIOSH efforts, the U.S. Green Building Council posted new PtD credits available for Leadership in Energy and Environmental Design (LEED) certification for construction. Additionally, they provide a wide variety of educational and guidance materials on the topic of PtD The NIOSH "Buy Quiet" initiative uses elements of prevention through design to encourage companies to buy quieter machinery, thereby reducing occupational hearing loss for their workers.

The Prevention through Design (PtD) Initiative of the National Institute for Occupational Safety and Health  collaborates with business, labor, trade unions, professional organizations, and academia. The curriculum focuses on “designing out” workplace hazards and threats in order to avoid sickness, injury, and death. Encourage technical accreditation bodies to include PtD in their evaluations to educate and encourage others to use PtD goals and processes in collaborative design and renovation of facilities, work processes, equipment, and resources. 

Priorities of this initiative include:
 attempting to make business executives aware of the cost-cutting potential of PtD, 
 produce succinct, actionable PtD guides and checklists for small companies, their insurers, and the publishers of local government codebooks,
 increase PtD practice by disseminating case studies of real-world PtD solutions and empowering stakeholders to implement and share them, and * encourage businesses, trade unions, governments, academic institutions, and consensus standards organizations to use PtD in policy revisions.

References

Sources

</ref>

See also

External links

 Prevention through Design
 The National Institute for Occupational Safety and Health
 Society of Manufacturing Engineers
 Australian Safety and Compensation Council
 Safety and Health Awareness for Preventive Engineering (SHAPE) program
 Whole Building Design approach
 Project Minerva and Minerva Canada
 Design for Construction Safety
 NIOSH Buy Quiet Topic Page

Further reading
 MacCollum, David V. Construction Safety Engineering Principles Designing and Managing Safer Job Sites (1st ed.). McGraw-Hill Professional. .
 Brauer, Roger L. Safety and Health for Engineers (2nd ed.). Wiley-Interscience. .

Occupational safety and health
Safety engineering
National Institute for Occupational Safety and Health
Occupational health psychology